The superior vesical artery supplies numerous branches to the upper part of the bladder. This artery often also gives branches to the vas deferens and can provide minor collateral circulation for the testicles.

Anatomy
The superior vesical artery is a branch of the umbilical artery. The vesiculo-prostatic artery usually arises from the superior vesical artery in men.

Distribution 

Other branches supply the ureter.

Variation
The middle vesical artery, usually a branch of the superior vesical artery, is distributed to the fundus of the bladder and the seminal vesicles. This artery is not usually described in modern anatomy textbooks. Instead, it is described that the superior vesical artery may exist as multiple vessels that arise from a common origin.

Development 
The first part of the superior vesical artery represents the terminal section of the previous portion of the umbilical artery (fetal hypogastric artery).

References

External links 
 

Arteries of the abdomen